An evaporator is a device which turns the liquid form of a substance into its gaseous or vapour form.  This is a widely used process and there are many applications for it.

Fundamental chemical production processes:
 Vacuum evaporation 
 Flash evaporation
 Multi-effect distillation

Mechanisms for performing evaporation:
 Rotary evaporator, a vacuum evaporator, typically used in chemistry laboratories
 Centrifugal evaporator
 Circulation evaporator
 Rising film evaporator
 Falling film evaporator
 Climbing and falling film plate evaporator
 Multiple-effect evaporator
 Vapor-compression evaporation

Air conditioning:
 Evaporative cooler, simple unpowered cooling
 Evaporative cooling chambers, an application thereof
 Spray pond, large scale external cooling

Refrigeration:
 Vapor-compression refrigeration, the common motor-driven form of refrigerator, where the evaporator forms the 'cold plate' within the refrigerator
 Absorption refrigerator, a refrigerator powered by a heat source, also with an evaporator as the cold plate

Production of potable drinking water and boiler feedwater at sea or on arid coasts:
 Evaporator (marine)
 Chaplin's patent distilling apparatus
 Vapor-compression desalination
 Multi-stage flash distillation